The Piccolo Giro di Lombardia is a one-day cycling race held annually in Lombardy, Italy. It is part of UCI Europe Tour in category 1.2U, meaning it is reserved for under 23 riders. The race acts as the U23 counterpart to the Giro di Lombardia.

Winners

References

Cycle races in Italy
UCI Europe Tour races
Recurring sporting events established in 1911
1911 establishments in Italy